Bicyclus amieti is a butterfly in the family Nymphalidae. It is found in Cameroon.

References

Elymniini
Butterflies described in 1996
Endemic fauna of Cameroon
Butterflies of Africa